Zdeněk Parma (30 March 1925 – 15 June 2006) was a Czech alpine skier. He competed in the men's slalom at the 1948 Winter Olympics.

References

External links
 

1925 births
2006 deaths
Czech male alpine skiers
Olympic alpine skiers of Czechoslovakia
Alpine skiers at the 1948 Winter Olympics
People from Frenštát pod Radhoštěm
Sportspeople from the Moravian-Silesian Region